FA Sápmi is a football association which is the organizer of the Sápmi football team representing the indigenous Sámi people. It is a member of the Confederation of Independent Football Associations (ConIFA), but not a member of either FIFA or UEFA. President of the FA Sápmi is Håkan Kuorak from Jokkmokk, Sweden. 

FA Sápmi was established in March 2014 as the successor of the 2003 founded Sámi Football Association (SSL), which had not been active in few years and had some financial trouble. FA Sápmi is the host of 2014 ConIFA World Football Cup.

References 

Association football governing bodies in Europe
Sámi associations
Football in Finland
Football in Norway
Football in Sweden
Sports organizations established in 2014
2014 establishments in Finland